Automatic is the eighth studio album by the alternative electronic artist VNV Nation, released in 2011. It was released on 16 September 2011 in Europe, and 25 October 2011 in North America.

The band describe the album as being quite melodic, except for the track "Control", which is said to be a more club-sounding track. They have even described the album as being their favourite so far.

In the first week of release the album went straight into the German mainstream Media Control charts at number 8, the band's first top ten hit, spending 3 weeks in the chart; no. 66 in Austria, charting for 1 week; no. 77 in Switzerland, charting for 1 week; and no. 50 in Sweden, charting for 1 week.  It also went to number 1 in the Deutsche Alternative Charts, a position it occupied for 4 weeks.

"Control" was released as a free-download prior to the album's release. Although not being an official single, "Nova" received radio air-play in Germany.

Track listing

References
http://www.vnvnation.com/Webfiles/future.htm

2011 albums
VNV Nation albums